ISS is an abbreviation for the International Space Station.

ISS may also refer to:

Organisations
Institute for Science and Society, an academic department at the University of Nottingham, England
Institute for Security Studies, Pretoria, South Africa studying crime, corruption, and conflict in Africa
Institute of Social Studies, an international institute in The Hague, the Netherlands
International Social Service, a charitable, non-governmental organisation
Information Systems & Services, a former part of the UK Ministry of Defence
Internal Security Service, national security intelligence agency of Oman
Istituto Superiore di Sanità, the Italian National Institute of Health
Intercollegiate Socialist Society (1905–1921), an American political youth organization

Businesses
ISS A/S, a Danish service company
Institutional Shareholder Services, a proxy advisory firm
Internet Security Systems, a security software vendor

Arts, entertainment, and media
I.S.S. (film), an upcoming American film
International Staff Songsters, the flagship choir of the Salvation Army
International Superstar Soccer, a video game series
ISS (2000 video game)
Idea Star Singer, a Malayalam music reality show by Asianet TV
Imperial Star Ship, a fictional spaceship designation prefix in Star Treks Mirror Universe

Education
ISS International School, an international school in Singapore
In-school suspension, a form of discipline used in some schools
Instituto San Sebastián Yumbel, Chilean school in Yumbel, Chile

Science and technology
Ion scattering spectroscopy or low-energy ion scattering, a materials analysis method
Imaging Science Subsystem, Cassini–Huygens space probe instruments
Instruction set simulator, a computer program that simulates a processor
International Seismological Summary, an earthquake catalog
Input Shaft Speed sensor, a sensor that measures the rotational speed of the input shaft in a vehicle

Medicine
Idiopathic short stature, an unexplained short stature
Injury Severity Score
International Staging System, for the severity of multiple myeloma

Other uses
Independent Subway System, a former rapid transit rail system in New York City, US
Islamic State in Somalia, a faction of the Islamic State of Iraq and the Levant
ISS Hockey (International Scouting Services), ice hockey scouting service
Air Italy (2005–2018) (ICAO: ISS), a defunct Italian airline
IShowSpeed (born 2005), American YouTuber

See also
IIS (disambiguation)
ISIS (disambiguation)

ja:ISS